Cava (plural cavas) is a sparkling wine of Denominación de Origen (DO) status from Spain. It may be white (blanco) or rosé (rosado). The Macabeo, Parellada and Xarel·lo are the most popular and traditional grape varieties for producing cava. Only wines produced in the traditional method may be labelled "cava"; those produced by other processes may only be called "sparkling wines" (vinos espumosos). About 95% of all cava is produced in the Penedès area in Catalonia, Spain, with the village of Sant Sadurní d'Anoia being home to many of the largest Catalan production houses. The two major producers are Codorníu and Freixenet. Cava is also produced in other villages in Aragon, Castile and León, Extremadura, La Rioja, Basque Country, Navarre and Valencia.

Marketing Cava as "Spanish champagne" is no longer permitted under European Union law, since Champagne has a Protected Geographical Status (PGS). Colloquially it is still called champán or champaña in Spanish or xampany in Catalan. Today it is defined by law as a "quality sparkling wine produced in a designated region" (Vino Espumoso de Calidad Producido en una Región Determinada, VECPRD).

The word champán in Spanish is not to be confused with achampañado, a colloquial term for the non-traditional sparkling wines. These achampañados wines are generally cheaper, are served by the bottle at bars or restaurants specializing in them and hence these establishments are called by the same name, i.e. achampañado. This is not cava, but it is a somewhat popular drink as well.

Name

The Spanish word cava (feminine, plural cavas, although Cava the wine is masculine) means "cave" or "cellar", as caves were used in the early days of cava production for the preservation or aging of wine.  Spanish winemakers officially adopted the term in 1970 to distinguish their product from French champagne.

History
Catalan sparkling wine was first made as early as 1851, while the roots of the cava industry can be traced back to Josep Raventós's travels through Europe in the 1860s, where he was promoting the still wines of the Codorníu Winery. His visits to the Champagne wine region   sparked an interest in the potential of a Spanish wine made using the same traditional method. He created his first sparkler in 1872, after the vineyards of Penedès were devastated by the phylloxera plague, and the predominantly red vines were being replaced by large numbers of vines producing white grapes.

Catalan cava producers pioneered a significant technological development in sparkling wine production with the invention of the gyropallet, a large mechanized device that replaced hand riddling, in which the lees are consolidated in the neck of the bottle prior to disgorgement and corking.

Production

According to Spanish law, cava may be produced in Catalonia. The Penedès is located in Catalonia. Cava is also produced in other villages in Aragon, Castile and León, Extremadura, La Rioja, Basque Country, Navarre and Valencia.

To make rosé cava, blending is not allowed. The wine must be made via Saignée method using Garnacha, Pinot noir, Trepat or Monastrell. Besides Macabeo, Parellada, and Xarel·lo, Cava may also contain Chardonnay, Pinot noir and Subirat grapes.  The first cava to use chardonnay was produced in 1981. Like any other quality sparkling wine, cava is produced in varying levels of sweetness, ranging from the dryest, brut nature, through brut, brut reserve, seco, semiseco, to dulce, the sweetest.

Notes

External links
 Official Website of DO Cava

Sparkling wines
Spanish wine
Catalan wine
Appellations
Wine regions of Spain